Katie Lou Samuelson (born June 13, 1997) is an American professional basketball player for the Los Angeles Sparks of the Women's National Basketball Association (WNBA). She played college basketball for the UConn Huskies.

High school career
Samuelson played for the Mater Dei High School basketball team for three seasons. As a sophomore in 2012–13, she averaged 20.9 points and 6.9 rebounds per game and helped Mater Dei to a 30–2 record. The following season, Samuelson averaged 29.2 points and 9.4 rebounds. She was named the 2014 California Player of the Year and was a USA Today first-team All-American. As a senior, Samuelson averaged 24.9 points and 8.5 rebounds. She helped Mater Dei win their third consecutive Trinity League championship and the 2015 state regional championship; the team finished 31–3. Following the 2014–15 season, Samuelson was named the national player of the year by Gatorade, USA Today, McDonald's, and the Women's Basketball Coaches Association, won the Naismith Trophy, and made the consensus All-American first team. During her high school career, she set Mater Dei single-season records for points average (29.2), field goal percentage (62.0), free throw percentage (89.4), free throws made (178), free throws attempted (211), and three-pointers made (117).

College career
Samuelson was a freshman at the University of Connecticut in 2015–16. She played in 37 of the Huskies' 38 games, including 22 starts. She missed the national championship game due to an injury. During the season, Samuelson scored 11.0 points per game and led the team with 78 made three-pointers, which was the second-most ever by a Connecticut freshman. She scored a season-high 22 points against Robert Morris on March 19. Samuelson was named the 2016 national freshman of the year by ESPNw. She was also named to the American Athletic Conference all-freshman team and the AAC all-tournament team.

In 2016–17, Samuelson started in all 37 of the Huskies' games. Her 20.2 points per game and 42.0 three-point field goal percentage both ranked second in the AAC. Her 119 made three-pointers that season was the second-highest in school history. On March 6, 2017, Samuelson scored a career-high 40 points against USF; she also set the NCAA single-game record for most three-pointers made without a miss, with 10. She was named the 2017 AAC co-player of the year and the AAC tournament most outstanding player. She was also selected as a first team All-American by the AP, WBCA, and USBWA, and made the AAC first team.

On January 13, 2019, Samuelson surpassed the 2,000 career point mark in a win over South Florida. She became the tenth UConn player to achieve this milestone.

National team career
Samuelson was part of the United States under-17 team who won the 2013 FIBA Americas U-16 Championship and subsequent 2014 FIBA U-17 World Championship.

Professional career

Chicago Sky (2019)
Samuelson was drafted 4th overall by the Chicago Sky in the 2019 WNBA draft, with whom she spent her rookie season. Across 20 games, she averaged 2.4 points, 0.9 rebounds, and 0.4 assists during 7.7 minutes per game.

Dallas Wings and Perfumerías Avenida (2020-2021)
Samuelson was traded to the Dallas Wings for Azura Stevens on February 14, 2020, making Katie Lou and her sister Karlie teammates for the first time as professionals. However, Karlie was waived before the season began. The sisters still wound up playing together in Spain, as Samuelson signed with Karlie's team Perfumerías Avenida. Samuelson helped Avenida win the Spanish championship and finish second in the continental EuroLeague, being listed on the team of the tournament in both championships.

Seattle Storm (2021)
Samuelson was traded on February 10, 2021 to the Seattle Storm for the number one overall pick in the 2021 WNBA draft, who became Charli Collier. While with Seattle, Samuelson became a full-time starter for the first time in her career, having started 24 of the 27 games she played for them while averaging career highs of 7 points, 3.5 rebounds, and 1.7 assists per game. Katie's sister Karlie later joined the Storm, and played three games with them in August and September 2021.

Los Angeles Sparks (2022–present)
Her tenure with the Storm ended on February 3, 2022, when she and the 2022 WNBA draft ninth pick were traded to the Los Angeles Sparks in exchange for Gabby Williams. Samuelson was a teammate with Williams for three years at UConn, and both women were selected fourth overall by the Chicago Sky in consecutive years, Williams having been picked in 2018.

Career statistics

College

|-
| style="text-align:left;"| 2015–16
| style="text-align:left;"| Connecticut
| 37 || 22 || 23.5 || .493 || .394 || .837 || 3.4 || 2.2 || 1.0 || 0.2 || 11.0
|-
| style="text-align:left;"| 2016–17
| style="text-align:left;"| Connecticut
| 37 || 37 || 32.1 || .486 || .420 || .840 || 3.9 || 3.2 || 1.5 || 0.3 || 20.2
|-
| style="text-align:left;"| 2017–18
| style="text-align:left;"| Connecticut
| 32 || 32 || 29.7 || .530 || .475 || .835 || 4.5 || 3.8 || 1.2 || 0.2 || 17.4
|-
| style="text-align:left;"| 2018–19
| style="text-align:left;"| Connecticut
| 34 || 34 || 33.1 || .453 || .376 || .876 || 6.3 || 3.9 || 1.2 || 0.6 || 18.5
|-
| colspan=2; align=center| Career
|140 || 125 || 29.6 || .491 || .416 || .847 || 4.5 || 3.3 || 1.2 || 0.3 || 16.8
|-

WNBA

Source

Regular season

|-
| style="text-align:left;"| 2019
| style="text-align:left;"| Chicago
| 20 || 0 || 7.6 || .316 || .276 || .800 || 0.9 || 0.4 || 0.3 || 0.1 || 0.2 || 2.4
|-
| style="text-align:left;"| 
| style="text-align:left;"| Dallas
| style="background:#D3D3D3"| 22° || 4 || 20.0 || .417 || .317 || .733 || 2.4 || 1.4 || 0.7 || 0.4 || 0.6 || 5.0
|-
| style="text-align:left;"| 
| style="text-align:left;"| Seattle
| style=| 27 || 24 || 21.0 || .456 || .351 || .731 || 3.5 || 1.7 || 0.7 || 0.3 || 1.1 || 7.0
|-
| style="text-align:left;"| 
| style="text-align:left;"| Los Angeles
| style=| 32 || 29 || 29.5 || .373 || .352 || .837 || 3.0 || 1.9 || 1.0 || 0.2 || 1.1 || 9.7
|- class="sortbottom"
| style="text-align:left;"| Career
| style="text-align:left;"| 4 years, 4 teams
| 101 || 57 || 20.8 || .399 || .339 || .791 || 2.6 || 1.4 || 0.7 || 0.2 || 0.8 || 6.5

Playoffs

|-
| style="text-align:left;"| 2019
| style="text-align:left;"| Chicago
| 2 || 0 || 2.1 || – || – || – || 0.5 || 0.5 || 0.0 || 0.0 || 0.0 || 0.0
|-
| style="text-align:left;"| 
| style="text-align:left;"| Seattle
| style=| 1 || 1 || 35.0 || .600 || .667 || 1.000 || 5.0 || 0.0 || 1.0 || 0.0 || 1.0 || 18.0
|- class="sortbottom"
| style="text-align:left;"| Career
| style="text-align:left;"| 2 years, 2 teams
| 3 || 1 || 13.0 || .600 || .667 || 1.000 || 2.0 || 0.3 || 0.3 || 0.0 || 0.3 || 6.0

Personal life
Samuelson was born in Fullerton, California. Her father Jon played basketball at Cal State Fullerton and professionally in Europe. Her mother Karen was a Netball player. Katie Lou has two older sisters who both played at Stanford: Bonnie, who after college decided to instead study optometry; and Karlie, who has played in the WNBA with the Los Angeles Sparks and Dallas Wings.

She became engaged to fellow basketballer Devin Cannady on February 4, 2022. Samuelson revealed on February 10, 2023 via Instagram that she and Cannady are expecting a baby in August 2023.

See also
 List of NCAA Division I women's basketball career 3-point scoring leaders

References

1997 births
Living people
All-American college women's basketball players
American women's basketball players
Basketball players at the 2014 Summer Youth Olympics
Basketball players from California
Chicago Sky draft picks
Chicago Sky players
Dallas Wings players
Los Angeles Sparks players
McDonald's High School All-Americans
Parade High School All-Americans (girls' basketball)
Seattle Storm players
Shooting guards
Small forwards
Sportspeople from Fullerton, California
UConn Huskies women's basketball players
Youth Olympic gold medalists for the United States